Peter Woods may refer to:
 Pete Woods, American comic book artist
 Peter Woods (footballer) (born 1950), English footballer
 Peter Woods (journalist) (1930–1995), British journalist, reporter and newsreader
 Peter Woods, guitarist in the band Romeo Void

See also
Peter Wood (disambiguation)